William Knight Bowers (born July 25, 1952) is an American politician. He is a former member of the South Carolina House of Representatives from the 122nd District, serving from 2013 to 2018. He is a member of the Democratic party.

Before serving as a representative, Bowers earned a B.S. from Clemson University, and MBA and PhD degrees from the University of South Carolina.

Political career 
In 1996, Bowers defeated three challengers in the Democratic primary. He went on to defeat Republican Charlie Drawdy Jr. to win election to South Carolina State House district 120. He ran unopposed in both the primary and general election in 1998. He again defeated Drawdy in the 2000 election. He ran unopposed in 2002 and 2004. In 2006, he defeated Republican Joe Flowers. He again ran unopposed in 2008. In 2010, he defeated Republican Dan Lawrence.

In 2012, Bowers was redistricted to District 122. He defeated incumbent Curtis Brantley in the Democratic primary. He was unopposed in the general election. Bowers again defeated Brantley in 2014. He faced no opposition in the general election.

In 2016, Bowers faced three other candidates in the Democratic primary, coming in first, but forced into a runoff. Bowers defeated Shedron Williams in the Democratic primary runoff.

In 2018, Bowers lost to Williams in the Democratic primary. Williams went on to win the general election.

Election history

https://www.enr-scvotes.org/SC/75708/Web02-state.203322/#/cid/28244

References

Living people
1952 births
Democratic Party members of the South Carolina House of Representatives
21st-century American politicians
People from Hampton County, South Carolina